Octavian Chihaia (born 18 March 1981 in Bucharest) is a former Romanian football striker. He is the son of former football International, Romulus Chihaia.

Chihaia debuted at Sportul Studenţesc. He later moved to Naţional București and Dinamo București. During the summer of 2006 he was traded to CFR Cluj for the price of 300,000 euros. He also played 2 matches for Dinamo București in the 2005–06 UEFA Cup. He transferred to CS Otopeni in the summer break of 2008.

Honours

Sportul Studențesc
Liga II: 2000–01

Dinamo București
Supercupa României: 2005

References

External links

 
 

Romanian footballers
FC Sportul Studențesc București players
CFR Cluj players
FC Dinamo București players
FC Progresul București players
CS Mioveni players
CS Otopeni players
1981 births
Living people
Romanian expatriate footballers
Expatriate footballers in China
Romanian expatriate sportspeople in China
Footballers from Bucharest
Association football forwards
Romanian football managers